The 1976–77 season was Leeds United's thirteenth consecutive season in the Football League First Division. Along with the First Division, they also competed in the FA Cup and the Football League Cup.

Season summary
Leeds United's league form was inconsistent and they could only muster fifteen league wins all season. Their start was poor with one win in their first nine games. They recovered a little through the autumn but continued to struggle for goals. Leeds though faded away and finished in 10th, their lowest finish since 1964.

On a more positive note, Leeds went on a brilliant FA Cup run they beat Norwich City, Birmingham City, Manchester City and Wolves to reach the semi finals, where they were drawn with Manchester United. They conceded two early goals at Hillsborough and even after Allan Clarke pulled a goal back, Leeds could not recover.

There was an inconsolable feeling about the club as the season drew to a close. The crowd of 16,891 who watched Leeds draw 1–1 with West Ham United on 26 April at Elland Road was the lowest since the club's return to the First Division, bearing testimony to the depression felt by the Leeds fans.

Competitions

Football League First Division

League table

Matches

Source:

FA Cup

Source:

League Cup

Source:

Notes

References

Leeds United F.C. seasons
Leeds United
Foot